Soo is a British glove puppet and TV character from the show Sooty and first appeared in 1964 as the girlfriend of Sooty. They still remain boyfriend and girlfriend today. In many episodes they kiss. Soo is a calm and collected female panda who acts as the foil for both Sooty and Sweep. Sometimes, Soo tells people off and is very intelligent, and usually wears a red skirt. In the spin-off series Sooty's Amazing Adventures, Soo wore a blue dress with a yellow flower on it and a white underpants instead.

Voice
The original voice artist and puppeteer for Soo was Harry Corbett's wife, Marjorie Corbett, who voiced Soo until 1980. Brenda Longman took over in 1981. In 2001, when the new owners of Sooty, Hit Entertainment, overhauled the production Sheila Clark became the voice of Soo in the second and third series of Sooty from 2001 - 2004.

Brenda Longman continued to play the character away from the TV series and in 2002 featured as Soo's voice in some McDonald's Happy Meals adverts. When Richard Cadell bought the rights to Sooty, Longman was asked back and her first TV appearance as Soo was when she appeared on The Weakest Link in 2007. She has remained since and currently voices her in Sooty show.

Other appearances 

Soo, along with Sooty and Sweep appear in The Goodies episode The Goodies Rule – O.K.?.

In 1991 Soo along with many other puppets appeared in the 1991 Comic Relief music video Helping Hand

In December 2007 Soo appeared on, and won, a puppet special of The Weakest Link hosted by Anne Robinson which was originally broadcast on 28 December 2007 at 6pm on BBC One, and was the strongest link statistically five times in the game, in Rounds 1, 2, 5, 6, and 7. She raised £11,500 for her chosen charity, the World Wide Fund for Nature, after defeating Roland Rat thanks to sudden death, and when voting, she generally sided with the majority of the other puppets, and was the deciding vote in Round 7, eliminating Nobby the Sheep. She is the second puppet to win The Weakest Link after Basil Brush. In her appearance on The Weakest Link, it is revealed that she owns a pair of wellingtons and wore them to the show.

On 30 September 2008, Brenda Longman, assisted by Soo, appeared on BBC One's Bargain Hunt, buying antiques at London's Portobello Road Market and then selling them at Bellmans Auction House in Sussex.

Filmography

See also
 Sooty
 Sweep (puppet)
 Richard Cadell

References

Television characters introduced in 1964
Female characters in television
British comedy puppets
Fictional pandas
Sooty